The Camouflage Central-Europe is the standard camouflage pattern of the French Armed Forces.

It is also used for vehicles of the French Army but with different shapes, since 1986, it took six years to generalize it to the entire military fleet. It is now being replaced since 2020 by the "Scorpion Camouflage" which is intended for new generation vehicles.

History
Camouflage Central Europe (CCE) was introduced in 1991, replacing both TAP 47 pattern camouflage and khaki F2 uniforms as used by the French military. But the pattern was brought to service by 1994.

In 2018, a contract worth €50 million was made for new combat suits in CCE camo pattern.

Two variants of the CCE are used in French military uniforms, which consist of the Uniform T3 and the Uniform T4. In 2019, the Tenue Combat F3 uniform was announced to be the standard uniform in CCE for the French Army.

In 2024, it's due to be replaced by a Multicam-based camo called the BME.

Design

It is suggested that the design of the CCE was primarily based around the summer foliage of Fontainebleau forest. The design is made of black branches and large horizontal medium green and brown colored elements on a tan background, being inspired by the U.S. Woodland pattern.

Variants

Camouflage Daguet

Users

 : Vests with the pattern used by Austrian Stabilisation Force in Bosnia and Herzegovina soldiers in 2004.
 : Used by the Cape Verdean National Guard.
 : CCE clones used by CAR military units.
 : CCE clones used by Comoran military units.
 : Introduced by the French military in 1991, but only adopted in service in 1994.
 : Used the similar camouflage pattern inspired by CCE for Indian Troops from 2006, officially designated as PC-DPM Being replaced by new disruptive digital pattern made by NIFT from 2022.
 : Used by Qatari troops deployed to Lebanon in 2006.
 : Used by Ukrainian Forces and Kastuś Kalinoŭski Regiment.
 : UAE troops wore CCE uniforms in Kosovo during peacekeeping operations.

References

Bibliography
 

Camouflage patterns
Military equipment introduced in the 1990s